The siege of Deventer was a siege of Deventer (then a major Hanseatic city) in 1456 during a struggle between Duke Philip the Good of Burgundy and the church, the nobility, and cities of the Oversticht (Overijssel).

Over the 15th century the Dukes of Burgundy became more and more influential in the Netherlands, striving for a stronger and more centralised grip on the country. In 1456 Duke Philip the Good made his illegitimate son David of Burgundy to be the successor of Rudolf van Diepholt as bishop of Utrecht. Overijssel's cities and nobility resented a Burgundian overlord and planned not to recognise Philip's choice, with the chapters of the Sticht Utrecht favouring another candidate, Gijsbrecht of Brederode. Philip thus took up arms and besieged Deventer for five weeks to make it accept his decision, which it finally did, accepting David as Deventer's temporal and spiritual overlord.

Deventer
1456 in Europe
Deventer 1456
Hanseatic League
Duchy of Burgundy
Deventer
History of Deventer
Deventer 1456